The Queen of Spades is a 1960 film adaptation of Tchaikovsky's opera The Queen of Spades, based on the 1834 Aleksandr Pushkin short story of the same name, and directed by Roman Tikhomirov.

The film, set in the 1820s, follows a man named Hermann, who has just returned from army service to Moscow. At the beginning of the film, he is in love with the beautiful young Liza - who is engaged to another - but soon he becomes fatally obsessed with learning the secret to a winning card combination from Liza's grandmother, the Countess.

The operatic parts were performed by Zurab Andzhaparidze, Tamara Milashkina, and Yevgeny Kibkalo.

For this film Oleg Strizhenov received the Aleksandr Pushkin's Big Gold Medal and the prize of the Russian Musical Fund of Irina Arkhipova "for the brilliant realization of the figure of Hermann in the film Queen of Spades".

Cast
 Hermann - Oleg Strizhenov
 Lisa - Olga Krasina
 Countess - Yelena Polevitskaya
 Count Tomsky - Vadim Medvedev
 Yeletsky - Valentin Kulik

External links

See also
 The Queen of Spades (opera)
 The Queen of Spades (1916 film)
 The Queen of Spades (1970 film)
 The Queen of Spades (1982 film)

1960 films
1960 in the Soviet Union
Soviet musical drama films
Soviet opera films
1960s Russian-language films
Films based on The Queen of Spades
Lenfilm films
Films set in the 1820s
Films about gambling
1960s ghost films
1960s musical drama films
1960 drama films